Snore or snoring may refer to:
SNORE, Southern Nevada Off Road Enthusiasts, an off-road desert racing organization
Edvīns Šnore, Latvian film director
Snoring